Abul Kasem is a Awami League politician and the former Member of Parliament of Chittagong-10.

Career
Kasem was elected to parliament from Chittagong-10 as an Awami League candidate in 1973.

References

Awami League politicians
Living people
1st Jatiya Sangsad members
Year of birth missing (living people)